The 2019–20 George Mason Patriots Men's basketball team represents George Mason University during the 2019–20 NCAA Division I men's basketball season. The season marks the 54th for the program, the fifth under head coach Dave Paulsen, and the seventh as members of the Atlantic 10 Conference. The Patriots play their home games at EagleBank Arena in Fairfax, Virginia.

Previous season
They finished last season 18–15, 11–7 in A-10 play to finish in fifth place. As the No. 5 seed in the A-10 tournament, they defeated GW in the second round before losing to St. Bonaventure in the quarterfinals.

Offseason

Departures

2019 recruiting class

Source

Roster

Player statistics

Schedule and results

|-
!colspan=12 style=| Exhibition

|-
!colspan=12 style=| Non-conference regular season

|-
!colspan=12 style=|<span style=>A-10 regular season

|-
!colspan=12 style=|A-10 tournament

References

George Mason
George Mason Patriots men's basketball seasons
George Mason men's basketball